Hilltop Road is SEPTA Media-Sharon Hill Trolley Line station in Upper Darby, Pennsylvania. It is officially located at Garrett Road and Hilltop Road, but also includes Bywood Avenue as it parallels the north side of the line. The station serves both Routes 101 and 102, and only local service is provided on both lines. The station contains two platforms with plexiglass bus-type shelters on both sides of the tracks, both of which are at the far end of each platform. The Beverly Hills Middle School is across from the south side of the station along Hilltop Road.

Trolleys arriving at this station travel between 69th Street Terminal further east in Upper Darby and either Orange Street in Media, Pennsylvania for the Route 101 line, or Sharon Hill, Pennsylvania for the Route 102 line. Both lines run parallel to Garrett Road and Bywood Avenue, however the run along Garrett Road is interrupted by a curve between Sherbrook Boulevard and Avon Road. Hilltop Road station is also one block east of the Beverly Hills trolley stop.

Station layout

References

External links

Hilltop; Media/Sharon Hill (Kavanaugh Transit Systems)
 Station from Google Maps Street View

SEPTA Media–Sharon Hill Line stations